KXKZ (107.5 FM, "Z107.5") is an American radio station broadcasting a country music format. Licensed to Ruston, Louisiana, United States, the station serves Ruston, Monroe, and surrounding areas.  The station is currently owned by Red Peach LLC.

In addition to country music the station is the flagship station for Louisiana Tech Bulldogs sports and also broadcasts Ruston High School football games.

One of the station's notable personalities is "Mountain Man", a semi-regular on the show Duck Dynasty.  He co-hosts "The Patrick and Mountain Man Show" on Monday afternoons from 3-6 PM.

References

External links

Radio stations in Louisiana
Country radio stations in the United States
Radio stations established in 1993
1993 establishments in Louisiana
Mass media in Ruston, Louisiana